"Are You Happy Now?" is a song by American singer Michelle Branch, released as the lead single from her second studio album, Hotel Paper (2003), on May 19, 2003. The single contains a non-album single called "Wanting Out" and a live acoustic version of the song "Hotel Paper" as its B-sides.

Written by Michelle Branch and John Shanks, "Are You Happy Now?" peaked at number 16 on the US Billboard Hot 100 and also reached the top 40 in New Zealand and the United Kingdom. It was also Branch's highest-charting solo single on the US Adult Top 40 chart, peaking at number three. The song was nominated for the Grammy Award for Best Female Rock Vocal Performance, losing out to Pink's "Trouble".

Chart performance
"Are You Happy Now?" peaked at number 16 on the US Billboard Hot 100 on the week ending August 16, 2003. The song stayed on the charts for 20 weeks. The song became Branch's fifth top-40 hit.

Track listings
European and Australian CD single
 "Are You Happy Now?" – 3:49
 "Wanting Out" – 3:48
 "Hotel Paper" (acoustic live) – 4:21

UK CD single
 "Are You Happy Now?" – 3:49
 "Wanting Out" – 3:48
 "Hotel Paper" (acoustic live) – 4:21
 "Are You Happy Now?" (video) – 3:49

Charts

Weekly charts

Year-end charts

Release history

"Wanting Out"
Despite not having an official single release, the B-side "Wanting Out" was released to digital media outlets in 2003 and managed to chart on the Billboard Hot Digital Tracks chart. However, since digital downloads were not being tallied for the Billboard Hot 100 at the time, the song did not appear on the latter chart.

Charts

References

2003 singles
2003 songs
American alternative rock songs
Maverick Records singles
Michelle Branch songs
Music videos directed by Meiert Avis
Post-grunge songs
Song recordings produced by John Shanks
Songs written by Michelle Branch
Songs written by John Shanks
Warner Music Australasia singles